Mysteries of Chinatown is an American crime drama series that aired on the ABC television network from December 4, 1949 to October 23, 1950. Marvin Miller made his television debut in the series.

Cast
 Marvin Miller as Dr. Yat Fu
 Gloria Saunders as Ah Toy, niece of Dr. Fu
 Cy Kendall (pilot only)
 Spencer Chan as Lu Sung
 Keye Luke
 Ed MacDonald as Sgt. Cummings
 William Blythe at Sgt. Hargrove
 Robert Bice (played Dr. Yat Fu only in the pilot.)
Wong Artarne as Yee Wai, nephew of Dr. Fu
Bo Ling as Lo Sing

Plot
The series focused on Dr. Yat Fu (Miller), the proprietor of a herb and curio shop in San Francisco's Chinatown, and also an amateur sleuth. Fu helped police to solve crimes, usually being helped by his nephew and niece.

Episodes included "The Body in Drawing Room D" and "The Case of the Missing Alibi".

Production
Mysteries of Chinatown originated at an east Hollywood studio that ABC bought from Warner Bros. Episodes were broadcast live in Hollywood and recorded via kinescope to be sent to New York for later transmission to the rest of the United States. Ray Buffum was the producer, and Richard Goggin was the director. Rex Koury provided the music. The program was sustaining.

References

External links
 Mysteries of Chinatown at IMDB
 List of episodes at CTVA

American Broadcasting Company original programming
1949 American television series debuts
1950 American television series endings
1940s American television series
1950s American crime drama television series
Black-and-white American television shows